Sutton is a small village in the Selby District in North Yorkshire, England.  It lies 1 mile north of Knottingley, across the River Aire in West Yorkshire.

The toponym is from the Old English sūð tūn, meaning "south farmstead".  The place was once known as Sutton in Elmet, from its location in the district of Elmet.  Sutton was historically a  township in the ancient parish of Brotherton in the West Riding of Yorkshire.  It became a separate civil parish in 1866, but in 1891 the civil parish was abolished and merged with the civil parish of Byram cum Poole to form the civil parish of Byram cum Sutton.  In 1974 it was transferred to the new county of North Yorkshire.

References

External links

Villages in North Yorkshire
Former civil parishes in North Yorkshire
Selby District